Molly Meyvisch (born 27 October 1995) is a Belgian professional racing cyclist. She rides for the Lotto-Soudal Ladies team.

See also
 List of 2015 UCI Women's Teams and riders

References

External links

1995 births
Living people
Belgian female cyclists
Place of birth missing (living people)
People from Sambreville
Cyclists from Namur (province)
21st-century Belgian women